The Ruler of Dubai is the position of the hereditary monarch and head of government of the Emirate of Dubai, one of the six ruling families of the UAE. The Ruler is also considered the head of the House of Maktoum, the royal family of Dubai. After the unification of the Emirate of Dubai within the United Arab Emirates, the Ruler of Dubai nominally assumes the position of Vice President of the United Arab Emirates and Prime Minister of the United Arab Emirates and sits at the seat reserved for Dubai at the Federal Supreme Council.

History 
In 1833, a migrating offshoot of the ruling Bani Yas tribe of Abu Dhabi settled to the small fishing village of Bur Dubai where Maktoum bin Butti bin Suhail become the sole Ruler of Dubai by 1836, establishing the Al-Maktoum dynasty. The relatively small Dubai relied on fishing, pearling, and foreign trade between the much larger Al Nahyan dynasty in Abu Dhabi and the Al Qasimi dynasty of Sharjah and establishing good relations with British forces which eventually culminated in the signing of an agreement with the British in 1892 to exclusively deal with the British Empire on all economic and foreign relation matters as part of the Trucial States. Following the withdrawal of the United Kingdom in 1971, then-Ruler of Dubai Rashid bin Saeed Al Maktoum joined with other ruling families of the former Trucial States to form the United Arab Emirates, where the position of Ruler of Dubai has retained significant autonomy from the federal government of the UAE with control of the emirate's judiciary, executive and legislative.

Functions and authority 
The Ruler of Dubai is the head of the Emirate, and head of the executive in the form of the Government of Dubai, which also runs a judiciary independent from the federal judiciary of the UAE appointed and overseen by the Ruler. The Ruler of Dubai issues royal decrees to establish laws that do not contradict with the UAE Constitution, establish, merge, or dissolve Dubai Government departments, and appoint any key position across the Emirates of Dubai, including members of the Dubai judicial system and members of the Dubai Executive Council, the legislative arm of the Emirate of Dubai.

As part of the complex relationship between the ruling Al-Maktoum family and private companies directly or indirectly controlled by the Dubai Government, or members of the ruling family, the Ruler of Dubai has extensive authority and influence over major companies in the Emirate.

Rulers of Dubai (1833-Present) 
The rulers of the Emirates of Dubai:

See also 
 House of Maktoum, the ruling family of Dubai
 Dubai Government

References 

 
Dubai, Ruler